Campaign is a commercial mixtape by American singer Ty Dolla Sign. It was released on September 23, 2016, by Atlantic Records. The mixtape was supported by three singles: "Campaign", "No Justice" and "Zaddy". The mixtape is a recurring theme expressing the views of Ty Dolla Sign and his friends and family on the presidential campaigns of Donald Trump and Hillary Clinton.

Promotion
"Campaign" was released as the first single on July 11, 2016. The song features a guest appearance from American rapper Future. Fittingly, the music video premiered the night before election day (November 7, 2016).

"No Justice" was released as second single on July 21, 2016. The song features a guest appearance from American recording artist Big TC (who is Ty's younger brother, who is still incarcerated in prison).

"Zaddy" was released as the third single on August 25, 2016. The music video for the song premiered on August 30, 2016.

"3 Wayz" was released as the first promotional single on September 1, 2016. The song features a guest appearance from American rapper Travis Scott. "Stealing" was released as the second promotional single on September 9, 2016.

Critical reception

Campaign was met with generally positive reviews. At Metacritic, which assigns a normalized rating out of 100 to reviews from professional publications, the album received an average score of 71, based on four reviews.

Winston Cook-Wilson of Pitchfork said, "Campaign outpaces his recent efforts like $ign Language and Airplane Mode but, still, mostly just preserve Ty's musical bottom line". Jordan Sargent of Spin said, "Campaign—a mixtape in name that feels not quite like a mixtape but not exactly like an album, either—is at its best when it carries on that tradition of richness of sound as a virtue in and of itself". Scott Glaysher of XXL said, "Campaign may not exceed the musical brilliance of Free TC but it's a close runner-up". Mick Jacobs of Pretty Much Amazing said, "As a mixtape, I understand why Campaign sounds so derivative, but still I wish Griffin had pushed a bit further in terms of musical experimentation".

Commercial performance 
Campaign debuted at number 28 on the US Billboard 200, with 14,000 album-equivalent units.

Track listing

Charts

References

2016 mixtape albums
Ty Dolla Sign albums
Atlantic Records albums